Alfred John West F.R.G.S. (1857–1937) was a British award-winning marine photographer in the Gosport firm of G. West and Son from 1881 (for an early reference see Exhibition Catalogue of the Photographic Society of Great Britain) and from 1897 at the age of 40, a pioneer cinematographer. He was then active in both roles until 1913 when he sold his copyright in negative plates of yachting studies to Beken of Cowes, and his stock of positive moving film in 1916 to a distributor, James Joseph Bennell, proprietor of: B. B. Film Hiring Service, 81, Dunlop Street, in Glasgow (see 'The Bioscope' - Thursday 7 September 1916 p 944 https://www.britishnewspaperarchive.co.uk/titles/the-bioscope) On the closure of the business, the film stock was then sold onwards to the 'Argosy Film Co. Ltd' in 1917 a company also registered at 81 Dunlop Street on 2 August 1917 (See 'The Bioscope' - Thursday 20 September 1917 page 6) which was in film business through the 1920s but was liquidated in 1930, the business passing to 'Audible Filmcraft' which was itself wound up in 1931. It is believed that the positive film stock was transferred from West to B.B. Hiring without completing the purchase.

West confirms in his unpublished autobiography Sea Salts and Celluloid (1936) that he sold the film hire business to a Glasgow distributor to be paid for over several years but that he "kept the negatives". However he was never paid and the bulk of the film stock cannot now be traced. A few tantalising clips remain as does a full descriptive catalogue in the British Library of all the moving film he created under the 'Our Navy' brand. Some potential clips have been located in the British Film Institute's online collection and those found so far are listed on the Our Navy website. The stock of A. J. West's negative plates was sold to Beken of Cowes in 1913 and is now (2020) being prepared for sale as a complete archive of yachting prints by the Brett Gallery Midhurst Hampshire. West's plates are said to be numbered from 500 to 10250 in the Beken/Brett archive. Alfred West died in 1937 and is buried at Highland Road Cemetery Portsmouth in Hampshire (E Plot, Row 19, Grave 14). An extensive  collection of newspaper references relating to West's work has been created through 2020.

Business
From c. 1880 Alfred John West worked alongside his brothers and sisters in his father George West's  photographic business 'G West and Son' at 97 High Street in Gosport Hants and later at 72 and 84 Palmerston Road Southsea. He became a nationally and internationally famous marine photographer, winning many national and international medals for his studies of yachts in full sail. His portrait of the Mohawk winning at the Royal Southampton Yacht Club Regatta in 1888 was awarded the gold medal at the St. Louis Convention USA for which 9 other countries competed.

In 1897 he converted to the newly developed 'moving' film and by 1898, his personal cinematographic business 'Our Navy' based in an annexe called 'The Anchorage' at his home 'Rozel' 7 Villiers Road Southsea, had a full-time staff of 50. In 1902 he formally registered the name 'Our Navy' under Limited Company number 72532 (National Archives Kew – Piece details BT 31/9737/72532).

Alfred West's cinematographic activity from 1897 was in exhibiting films related to Naval, and later Military, Empire and Yachting subjects under the general title of 'Our Navy'. The shows were presented in halls and later in purpose-built cinemas across the UK and the British Empire.

The London home of 'Our Navy' was the Regent Street Polytechnic (now the University of Westminster), which still houses one of London's first purpose-built cinema halls, the Regent Street Cinema. The Lumiere Brothers gave the first ever public film show of moving pictures in the United Kingdom on 21 February 1896 in the hall. (A programme of restoration has been carried out which has revived the cinema and revealed a few of its late 19th-century features). 'Our Navy' also exhibited at The Crystal Palace and the People's Palace in the Mile End Road.

Photographic methods
Alfred J. West invented his own shutter and stabilising devices and mounted his heavy dry plate camera in the well of a sailing yawl. This was manoeuvred by his boatman under the lee of large racing yachts to obtain the best shots of these heavily-canvassed vessels at full speed.

In 1898, during the early period of cinematographic technical development, his employee James Adams was granted a patent for "Improvements in and relating to cameras and projecting Apparatus for Kinematograph Pictures" (No. 9738 of AD 1898) by the UK Patent Office.

Photographing the Turbinia

In 1897, Alfred J. West obtained photographs of the Turbinia steam yacht travelling at full speed at the Royal Fleet Review. He was subsequently invited by Charles Algernon Parsons to film and photograph the vessel in the Tyne and the pictures captured remain the defining image of Turbinia at speed. Sir Charles Parsons is believed to the person standing in the conning tower in this picture. None of the moving pictures have survived.

West writes in his (unpublished) 1936 autobiography as follows:

Subsequently, West's 'Our Navy' made regular use of this shot in its publicity and brochures, and the moving pictures of the vessel were frequently shown as part of the performances and referred to specifically in the promotional material associated with the shows as ' Turbinia ... showing the effects of foam etc '.

Royal Command Performances – 1898 and 1901

On its return to port, he gave a Royal Command Performance of the material to Queen Victoria at Osborne House in the isle of Wight. The Duke of York wrote a short review of the performance in his diary for 27 August 1898 "After dinner West showed his animated photographs & McGregor the photos he took on bd. The 'Crescent' on a screen, very well done"
(Diary Extract reproduced by kind permission of HM The Queen)

A second Royal Command performance showing 'animated photographs' was given to Edward VII, his family and Estate staff on 9 November 1901 at Sandringham. The film shown at that presentation was taken by Alfred West's assistant, Chief Petty Officer McGregor, who had been taken on board as official photographer for 'Our Navy' for the world cruise of the converted liner 'Ophir'. The cruise was undertaken by The Prince of Wales (later George V) and his family. Although West wrote proudly in his unpublished autobiography that the event was successful and involved ministers of state and other guests, the Prince of Wales wrote about this occasion on 10 November 1901 saying: "Afterwards West and McGregor showed the cinematograph photographs, taken by the latter, during our tour in the Colonies in the ball room, all the tenants & servants came, they were interesting but not very successful." (Diary Extract reproduced by kind permission of HM The Queen).

Trafalgar centenary 1905
At the culminating Albert Hall celebrations on 21 October 1905, Alfred West showed a programme of patriotic and nautical films. The Times of London reported on 20 October: "... Mr Alfred West, well known for admirable kinematographic shows of a naval character, will give a novel one, illustrating the reception of the French Fleet". The show also featured a sequence of a very old seaman who had served with Admiral Hyde-Parker (one of Nelson's captains) accompanied by a petty officer from the Royal Naval Barracks and two boys from the Royal Seamen and Marines’ Orphanage. This sequence survives as one of the extant film clips of 'Our Navy'.

Endorsement of BOROID safety film

In 1910, West enthusiastically endorsed a new, non-inflammable, film format 'BOROID' which was presented to the British cinematographic trade using acetate-based cellulose. It was developed, he claimed 'accidentally', by the prolific inventor Benno Borzykowski, a partner in Photochemie G.m.b.H. Berlin, and Director of the Benobor Syndicate, who had worked on patents for artificial silk and other fabrics. BOROID' was a by-product of that work but was not patented. Borzykowski published other UK patents which substituted acetates for celluloid, including "patent application number 21,719 for A New or Improved Process for the Production of a Substitute for Glass Sheets or Plates and other Articles." in 1910.

The Boroid company commenced trading on 21 November 1910, being originally registered in London at 58 Coleman St., moving to 104 High Holborn in May 1911, and finally to 48 Rupert St. in June 1913.
Boroid Ltd. issued its detailed share prospectus in the (Westminster Gazette of Monday 16 January 1911 (P12 col. 1 and 2): A number of testimonials were provided, including a very detailed one from Alfred J West F.R.G.S. of 'Our Navy', in which he proposed to move his entire production to 'non-flam' BOROID film: 'BOROID' had most of its assets in Germany, and the Great War of 1914-1919 put an immediate end to the business in the UK when BOROID film stock became unavailable, although it was claimed by Borzykowski in 1919 that 'several million feet' a week were being sold in the UK before being forced to close there. A Receiver was appointed by the debenture holders on 12 May 1914 (The London Project). Borzykowski moved to America in 1915 and recommenced work on Boroid (Educational Film Magazine April 1919 P 22-25 : P 136 in PDF file. In this article he refers to Alfred West's detailed and strong endorsement of Boroid safety film. In July 1910, West had taken part in a dramatic demonstration at the Criterion Restaurant (reported in 'The Globe' (Saturday 02 July 1910, P11, Col 4) "... in the course of which its non-inflammability was amply shown. Whereas a cigarette end applied to a piece of ordinary celluloid caused it to burst into flame almost immediately, the new substance, which has all the transparency and pliability of celluloid, merely melted away when exposed to the flame of a lighted match. A piece of celluloid and a piece of the new substitute were also placed successively in a cinematograph machine and exposed to the concentrated heat rays. The celluloid flamed within three seconds, but the Boroid remained exposed for three or four minutes and appeared to be quite unaffected." (See also The Referee - Sunday 03 July 1910 P3, col 4)

Ephemera collections
Much work was done by the late twin brothers John and William Barnes, film historians, in tracking down and collecting ephemera related to Alfred West, 'Our Navy' and the G. West and Son precursor business. This is held for posterity in the Barnes Collection at Hove Museum and Art Gallery. Some material not yet deposited and catalogued is held privately.

Books of press cuttings collected from South Coast newspaper libraries by West's grandson, Antony Scott Clover (1917–1998), are held in the family, as are some facsimile copies of ephemeral material and prints of yachting plates. A review of all the newspaper articles and advertisements for Alfred West and Our Navy compiled in 2020-2021 from the British Newspaper Archive and Australian and New Zealand sources  is available as a PDF file at https://drive.google.com/file/d/1WAE1AADDCN9gL3FiCVx7eR3l7S3KcSgi/view

A series of cigarette cards and postcards in a numbered series were produced to accompany the 'Our Navy' presentations and these were widely circulated and are still collected by specialists.

'Spot' promotional material included slips of paper promoting the show which were enclosed in a blue wrapper to give the appearance of medical 'powders' often taken for headache and other ailments. Hundreds of these were placed in public places awaiting discovery.

Extant film clips
The few clips that are still extant of West's film are held as originals in the BFI National Archive and are curated by the Wessex Film and Sound Archive at Winchester, Hants.

They can also be viewed in low resolution on the 'Our Navy' Website

The following titles are listed (amongst others) at the Internet Movie Database. It is not yet known who has compiled the list or from what source, but the titles listed are convincing:
The Bombardment of Port Arthur	1904
Attack and Defence by Sailors 1898
Away Aloft: Climbing the Rigging on Board the St. Vincent 1898
Away Boats' Crews 1898
Barbette Guns in Action 1898
Boats of the Channel Squadron Pulling Round the Fleet 1898
Commander Giving Instructions: Beat to Quarters 1898
Commander Giving Instructions: Dismiss 1898
H.M.S. Crescent Leaving Portsmouth Harbour 1898
H.M.S. Crescent Steaming at Full Speed 1898
Lee Bow View of Crack Yachts 1898
March Past on the Quarterdeck 1898
Midshipmen at Physical Drill 1898
Naval Brigade Firing Royal Salute on Southsea Common 1898
On Board H.M.S. Majestic: All Hands on Deck 1898
One Design Yacht Gybing Round Outer Spit Buoy 1898
Portsmouth Dockyard Gates 1898
Seamen at Drill: Sailors at Field Gun Drill 1898
Seamen at Drill: Sailors at Single Stick Exercises 1898
The Channel Squadron Getting Under Way 1898
Torpedo Practice 1898
Turbinia 1898
Two Best Dancers in the Navy Dancing on the Forecastle 1898
Weather View of Yacht Racing in Rough Sea 1898

These entries may relate to extant clips preserved from the period, or they may simply have been copied from a contemporary catalogue.

References

Pioneers of the British Film, John Barnes, Bishopsgate Press, 1983 , pp. 45–53
Who’s Who of Victorian Cinema, Stephen Herbert and Luke McKernan (eds), British Film Institute, 1996, pp. 149–150
Alfred John West and the Trafalgar Centenary, David Clover, H. Lewis-Jones, A. Cross (eds), The Trafalgar Chronicle 2009, Vol 19, pp. 266–282
'Limelights and shadows' : popular and visual culture in South West England, 1880–1914, Leveridge, Rosalind Claire, PhD thesis, pp192–195, University of Exeter, 2011

External links
'Our Navy' main website
Extant Film Clips
IMDB Entry
'Sea Salts and Celluloid' – West's Autobiography
Facsimile of film catalogue
Transcript of film catalogue
AJ West's Obituary – Hampshire Telegraph and Post
Who's Who of Victorian Cinema
Beken of Cowes
Brett Gallery Midhurst
Wessex Film and Sound Archive
Barnes Collection Archive – Hove Museum
Charles Urban Motion Picture Pioneer
Regent Street Polytechnic Cinema Project

1857 births
1937 deaths
English cinematographers
Photographers from Hampshire
People from Gosport